Stari plac (lit. "Old ground"), also often referred to as Plinara Stadion, (or incorrectly in some foreign sources as Plinada Stadion) is a stadium in Split, Croatia used originally for association football and later mainly for rugby union. It hosted a match between Yugoslavia and Netherlands in the UEFA Euro 1972 qualifying tournament, and in April 2010 a match between Croatia national rugby union team playing against Netherlands in the 2008-10 European Nations Cup tournament. Stari plac is the home ground of Rugby Club Nada Split.

The area the stadium was built on was originally a gasworks and was also used as a military training ground by the army. It was initially used as the home stadium of HNK Hajduk Split, and although it was their basic venue in the early years and it was not until 1926 that the first stand was built.

In the beginning the 100 x 60 meters pitch was oriented west-to-east. After First World War it was resized to 105 x 70 meters on a north-to-south orientation. Its first wooden stands, built in 1926, burned down that same year. Three years later new  stands were built with a capacity of 900 people, but these were gradually demolished during the Second World War. After the war the stadium received a major reconstruction with a new drainage system, and a wooden west stand for 1400 people. Ten years later the sandy pitch was replaced with grass one, and later on new stands were built on eastern side of the pitch.

In November 2009 Hajduk fans watched a home game versus Dinamo Zagreb on a big screen in the Stari plac, rather than see the game in the Poljud, in a protest against actual club board.

References

External links
 Old ground photo and aerial photo/location at Panoramio

Sports venues in Split, Croatia
Football venues in Croatia
Football venues in Yugoslavia
HNK Hajduk Split
Rugby union stadiums in Croatia